The Gay Caballero is a 1932 American pre-Code Western film directed by Alfred L. Werker and written by Barry Conners and Philip Klein. The film stars George O'Brien, Victor McLaglen, Conchita Montenegro, Linda Watkins, C. Henry Gordon and Weldon Heyburn. The film's screenplay was adapted from the novel The Gay Bandit of the Border by Tom Gill. The film was released on February 14, 1932, by Fox Film Corporation.

Cast       
George O'Brien as Ted Radcliffe
Victor McLaglen as Don Bob Harkness/"El Coyote"
Conchita Montenegro as Adela O'Brien Morales
Linda Watkins as Ann Grey
C. Henry Gordon as Don Paco Morales
Weldon Heyburn as Jito
Martin Garralaga as Manuel
Willard Robertson as Maj. Lawrence Blount
Juan Torena as Juan Rodrigues
Al Ernest Garcia as Bandit

References

External links
 
 

1932 films
1930s English-language films
Fox Film films
American Western (genre) films
1932 Western (genre) films
Films directed by Alfred L. Werker
American black-and-white films
1930s American films